New Carthage may refer to:

Nuevo Cartago y Costa Rica Province
Cartagena, Spain (which might be the same as Mastia)
 New Carthage, Louisiana